The 2011 Arkansas Razorbacks football team represents the University of Arkansas in the 2011 NCAA Division I FBS football season. The Razorbacks were led by fourth year head coach Bobby Petrino and played five home games at Donald W. Reynolds Razorback Stadium and two at War Memorial Stadium. They are a member of the Western Division of the Southeastern Conference. They finished the season with an 11–2 overall record, 6–2 in SEC West Division play, finishing in 3rd place with losses to LSU and Alabama, the two teams that played in the BCS National Championship Game.  They were invited to the 2012 Cotton Bowl Classic and defeated Kansas State 29–16.  The win capped off only the third 11-win season in Arkansas' 119-year football history.  They also finished fifth in the final AP Poll—their highest national ranking since finishing third in 1977. Tyler Wilson became the first Arkansas QB to be voted 1st Team All-SEC. WR Jarius Wright and DE Jake Bequette were also named 1st Team All-SEC. WR Joe Adams was also placed on the 1st Team All-SEC squad, as well as being named a consensus 1st team All-American as a punt returner, and won the inaugural Jet Award given to the nation's best return specialist. 

Although this season was very successful, this would ultimately be Petrino's final season as head coach at Arkansas, as he was fired in the offseason. After a motorcycle accident on April 1, 2012 lead to the discovery that he had covered up an extramarital affair with a member of his staff, and that Petrino had hired the young lady in question over several other applicants for the position. It was also revealed that he paid her money as a "gift", and then lied about the entire incident to then Athletic Director Jeff Long, prompting Long to release Petrino with cause.

Schedule

Personnel

Coaching staff

Roster

Rankings

Game summaries

Missouri State

New Mexico

Troy

Alabama

Texas A&M

    
    
    
    
    
    
    
    
    
    
    
    
    

On September 25, 2011 (six days prior to the game) Texas A&M announced that it would once again become conference mates with Arkansas, by joining the Southeastern Conference as a full member beginning in 2012.

Near the end of the game, Arkansas fans acknowledged A&M's announcement by appearing on the Cowboys Stadium jumbotron with a large sign saying "Welcome to the SEC".

Auburn

Ole Miss

Vanderbilt

South Carolina

Tennessee

Mississippi State

A day after the game, tight end Garrett Uekman was found dead in his dorm room of heart problems.

LSU

Kansas State

Arkansas and Kansas State met for the first time in postseason and for the fifth time overall.  The Razorbacks netted their first Cotton Bowl Classic win since 2000. The 2012 Cotton Bowl was the only non-BCS bowl that featured two Top 10 opponents.

Notes

References

Arkansas
Arkansas Razorbacks football seasons
Cotton Bowl Classic champion seasons
Arkansas Razorbacks football